Harbor Road Historic District is a national historic district located at Cold Spring Harbor in Suffolk County, New York.  The district has 18 contributing residential buildings.   The majority of the residences represent the village's earliest settlement.  It also contains four residences from the mid-19th century when the village was a major whaling port.

It was added to the National Register of Historic Places in 1985.

References

External links
Harbor Road Historic District Map (Living Places)

Historic districts on the National Register of Historic Places in New York (state)
Federal architecture in New York (state)
Italianate architecture in New York (state)
Historic districts in Suffolk County, New York
National Register of Historic Places in Huntington (town), New York